Elections to Wolverhampton Metropolitan Borough Council were held on 7 May 1992. One third of the council was up for election and the Conservative Party led the Council in coalition with the Liberal Democrats until the next round of elections in 1994.

Composition

Prior to the election, the composition of the council was:

Labour Party 35
Conservative Party 22
Liberal Democrat 3

After the election, the composition of the council was:

Labour Party 29
Conservative Party 28
Liberal Democrat 3

Election result

Ward results

1992
1992 English local elections
1990s in the West Midlands (county)